The visible spectrum is the portion of the electromagnetic spectrum that is visible to the human eye. Electromagnetic radiation in this range of wavelengths is called visible light or simply light. A typical human eye will respond to wavelengths from about 380 to about 750 nanometers. In terms of frequency, this corresponds to a band in the vicinity of 400–790 terahertz. These boundaries are not sharply defined and may vary per individual. Under optimal conditions these limits of human perception can extend to 310 nm (ultraviolet) and 1100 nm (near infrared). The optical spectrum is sometimes considered to be the same as the visible spectrum, but some authors define the term more broadly, to include the ultraviolet and infrared parts of the electromagnetic spectrum as well.

The spectrum does not contain all the colors that the human visual system can distinguish. Unsaturated colors such as pink, or purple variations like magenta, for example, are absent because they can only be made from a mix of multiple wavelengths. Colors containing only one wavelength are also called pure colors or spectral colors.

Visible wavelengths pass largely unattenuated through the Earth's atmosphere via the "optical window" region of the electromagnetic spectrum. An example of this phenomenon is when clean air scatters blue light more than red light, and so the midday sky appears blue (apart from the area around the sun which appears white because the light is not scattered as much). The optical window is also referred to as the "visible window" because it overlaps the human visible response spectrum. The near infrared (NIR) window lies just out of the human vision, as well as the medium wavelength infrared (MWIR) window, and the long-wavelength or far-infrared (LWIR or FIR) window, although other animals may perceive them.

History

In the 13th century, Roger Bacon theorized that rainbows were produced by a similar process to the passage of light through glass or crystal.

In the 17th century, Isaac Newton discovered that prisms could disassemble and reassemble white light, and described the phenomenon in his book Opticks. He was the first to use the word spectrum (Latin for "appearance" or "apparition") in this sense in print in 1671 in describing his experiments in optics. Newton observed that, when a narrow beam of sunlight strikes the face of a glass prism at an angle, some is reflected and some of the beam passes into and through the glass, emerging as different-colored bands. Newton hypothesized light to be made up of "corpuscles" (particles) of different colors, with the different colors of light moving at different speeds in transparent matter, red light moving more quickly than violet in glass. The result is that red light is bent (refracted) less sharply than violet as it passes through the prism, creating a spectrum of colors.

 Newton originally divided the spectrum into six named colors: red, orange, yellow, green, blue, and violet. He later added indigo as the seventh color since he believed that seven was a perfect number as derived from the ancient Greek sophists, of there being a connection between the colors, the musical notes, the known objects in the Solar System, and the days of the week. The human eye is relatively insensitive to indigo's frequencies, and some people who have otherwise-good vision cannot distinguish indigo from blue and violet. For this reason, some later commentators, including Isaac Asimov, have suggested that indigo should not be regarded as a color in its own right but merely as a shade of blue or violet. Evidence indicates that what Newton meant by "indigo" and "blue" does not correspond to the modern meanings of those color words. Comparing Newton's observation of prismatic colors to a color image of the visible light spectrum shows that "indigo" corresponds to what is today called blue, whereas his "blue" corresponds to cyan.

In the 18th century, Johann Wolfgang von Goethe wrote about optical spectra in his Theory of Colours. Goethe used the word spectrum (Spektrum) to designate a ghostly optical afterimage, as did Schopenhauer in On Vision and Colors. Goethe argued that the continuous spectrum was a compound phenomenon. Where Newton narrowed the beam of light to isolate the phenomenon, Goethe observed that a wider aperture produces not a spectrum but rather reddish-yellow and blue-cyan edges with white between them. The spectrum appears only when these edges are close enough to overlap.

In the early 19th century, the concept of the visible spectrum became more definite, as light outside the visible range was discovered and characterized by William Herschel (infrared) and Johann Wilhelm Ritter (ultraviolet), Thomas Young, Thomas Johann Seebeck, and others.
Young was the first to measure the wavelengths of different colors of light, in 1802.

The connection between the visible spectrum and color vision was explored by Thomas Young and Hermann von Helmholtz in the early 19th century. Their theory of color vision correctly proposed that the eye uses three distinct receptors to perceive color.

Color perception across species

Many species can see light within frequencies outside the human "visible spectrum". Bees and many other insects can detect ultraviolet light, which helps them find nectar in flowers. Plant species that depend on insect pollination may owe reproductive success to their appearance in ultraviolet light rather than how colorful they appear to humans. Birds, too, can see into the ultraviolet (300–400 nm), and some have sex-dependent markings on their plumage that are visible only in the ultraviolet range. Many animals that can see into the ultraviolet range cannot see red light or any other reddish wavelengths. Bees' visible spectrum ends at about 590 nm, just before the orange wavelengths start. Birds can see some red wavelengths, although not as far into the light spectrum as humans. The popular belief that the common goldfish is the only animal that can see both infrared and ultraviolet light is incorrect, because goldfish cannot see infrared light.

Most mammals are dichromatic, and dogs and horses are often thought to be color blind. They have been shown to be sensitive to colors, though not as many as humans. Some snakes can "see" radiant heat at wavelengths between 5 and 30 μm to a degree of accuracy such that a blind rattlesnake can target vulnerable body parts of the prey at which it strikes, and other snakes with the organ may detect warm bodies from a meter away. It may also be used in thermoregulation and predator detection. (See Infrared sensing in snakes)

Spectral colors

Colors that can be produced by visible light of a narrow band of wavelengths (monochromatic light) are called pure spectral colors. The various color ranges indicated in the illustration are an approximation: The spectrum is continuous, with no clear boundaries between one color and the next.

Color display spectrum

Color displays (e.g. computer monitors and televisions) cannot reproduce all colors discernible by a human eye. Colors outside the color gamut of the device, such as most spectral colors, can only be approximated.

Spectroscopy

Spectroscopy is the study of objects based on the spectrum of color they emit, absorb or reflect. Visible-light spectroscopy is an important tool in astronomy (as is spectroscopy at other wavelengths), where scientists use it to analyze the properties of distant objects. Chemical elements and small molecules can be detected in astronomical objects by observing emission lines and absorption lines. For example, Helium was first detected by analysis of the spectrum of the sun. The shift in frequency of spectral lines is used to measure the Doppler shift (redshift or blueshift) of distant objects to determine their velocities towards or away from the observer. Astronomical spectroscopy uses high-dispersion diffraction gratings to observe spectra at very high spectral resolutions.

Properties

Heat
Although non-visible infrared light is more commonly thought of as "heat radiation", any frequency of light, including visible light, will heat surfaces that absorb them.  A powerful source of purely visible light, such as a visible light laser, can char paper.

Biological effects
High-energy visible light (HEV light) (violet/blue light, with a wavelength of 400-450 nm) has a number of biological effects, especially on the eye. 
Studies by Harvard Health Publishing and France's ANSES found that exposure to blue light has a negative effect on sleep and can lead to impaired vision.

See also

High-energy visible light
Electromagnetic absorption by water

References

Color
Electromagnetic spectrum
 
Vision